Shaun Robert Miller (born 25 September 1987) is an English professional footballer who last played as a striker for Nantwich Town.

Miller began his career at Crewe Alexandra before moving to Sheffield United in 2012 and Coventry City in 2014. He also spent time on loan at Witton Albion, Shrewsbury Town and York City. He was released by Coventry in 2015 before signing for Morecambe. Miller spent one season there before joining Carlisle United in 2016, returning to Crewe on loan in early 2018 and rejoining the club in May 2018. In July 2019, he returned to Morecambe on a season-long loan. He was released by Crewe in June 2020 and subsequently joined Bolton three months later.

Early and personal life
Born in Alsager, Cheshire, Miller has a son called Zac who was born in January 2014.

Career

Crewe Alexandra
Miller started his career with Crewe Alexandra's youth system, and he signed a professional contract with the club on 3 July 2006. He made his first-team debut on 11 November 2006 in a 4–0 FA Cup loss to Bradford City at Valley Parade. He made his league debut in a 1–0 loss away to Gillingham on 10 March 2007, before marking his first professional start with a goal in a 2–1 loss away to Blackpool at the end of the month.

In his second season Miller was in and out of the first team making 17 appearances, his only goal coming in a 4–1 home loss to AFC Bournemouth. The following season Miller played 40 times for Crewe, scoring 7 goals. He scored his first goal of the 2009–10 season in a 2–1 loss at home to Aldershot Town. He finished the season with 7 goals including a goal in a 1–0 win against rivals Port Vale.

On 21 August 2010, he scored two goals as Crewe beat Barnet 7–0 at home. He scored his fifth goal of the season in an incredible 5–5 draw with Chesterfield. He scored his 17th goal of the season in an 8–1 win against Cheltenham Town. On the final day of the season Miller scored two goals as Crewe beat Bradford 5–1, giving him a total of 19 goals for the season. His first goal of the 2011–12 season came in a 3–2 League Cup defeat to Preston North End. On 3 September he scored two goals as Crewe beat Oxford United 3–1. He scored his 5th league goal of the season in a 3–1 win over Barnet on 10 September. On 17 December 2011 Miller was sent off in a 1–1 draw against Crawley Town.

Sheffield United
Miller signed for Sheffield United at the end of July 2012, agreeing a two-year contract with the option of a further year. He made his debut on 11 August 2012, in a 2–2 draw against Burton Albion in the League Cup, and made his league debut a week later during a 1–0 win against Shrewsbury Town at Bramall Lane. Miller had to wait until mid October to score his first goals for the club, netting twice in a 4–1 win against Notts County in the Football League Trophy. On 1 December 2012, Miller netted two goals in the 90th minute for the Blades in a 2–1 win over Port Vale in the FA Cup second round. Miller then scored against Scunthorpe in a 3–0 victory on Boxing Day 2012, only to be taken off later in the match with what turned out to be cruciate ligament damage to his knee, ruling him out for almost nine months. Miller did not appear for the United first team again until 19 October 2013, in a 2–1 victory against Port Vale at Bramall Lane. On 4 February 2014, Miller scored an extra time winning goal away at Premier League Fulham in a fourth-round FA Cup replay match.

On 22 March 2014, Miller joined Shrewsbury Town on loan until the end of the season, scoring an injury time winner on his debut, as a substitute against Bradford City. Miller scored three goals in eight appearances before returning to United. On 15 May, it was revealed that Sheffield United would not be renewing Miller's contract, thus making him a free agent.

Coventry City
Miller signed a one-year contract with League One club Coventry City on 16 July 2014. He scored two goals in the early stages of the season, both coming off the bench against Cardiff City in the League Cup and in the league against Bristol City.

Morecambe
Miller signed for League Two club Morecambe on 5 August 2015 on a one-year contract.

Carlisle United
On 17 June 2016, Miller joined Morecambe's League Two rivals Carlisle United on a two-year contract. He scored his first goal for Carlisle in a 2–1 EFL Cup win against Port Vale on 9 August 2016. In October 2017, Miller became the first player to be charged with a simulated dive under new FA rules and served a two match ban.

Crewe Alexandra
On 25 January 2018, Miller rejoined Crewe Alexandra on loan for the remainder of the 2017–18 season, scoring six goals in 15 appearances. On 17 May 2018, Miller signed a two-year-contract, with an option of a further year, to return to Crewe. He scored the first goal of his new spell at Crewe at Gresty Road in a 2–0 win over Grimsby Town on 27 October 2018. However, he made only 16 league starts during the 2018–2019 season, and in May 2019 was transfer-listed at his own request.

Morecambe return (loan) 
On 24 July 2019, Miller returned to Morecambe, on a season-long loan deal from Crewe.

His release by Crewe was announced on 10 June 2020.

Bolton Wanderers
On 5 September 2020 Miller signed for newly relegated Bolton Wanderers on a one-year contract and was assigned number 20. He made his debut later the same day, coming on as a late substitute for Liam Gordon in Bolton's first match of the season, a 1–2 home defeat against Bradford in the first round of the EFL Cup. He scored his first goal three days later, scoring Bolton's second equaliser after coming off the bench once again in 2–3 home defeat against his former club Crewe Alexandra in the EFL Trophy. His first League goal, and 100th career goal, came on 20 February 2021 as he scored Bolton's winner in a 1–0 win against Southend United. On 19 May 2021 Bolton announced he would be released at the end of his contract.

Nantwich Town
On 7 August 2021 Miller signed for Northern Premier League side Nantwich Town. He scored on his debut in a 3-2 win against Stalybridge Celtic. Miller had his contract terminated by mutual consent in December 2022.

Career statistics

References

External links

1987 births
Living people
People from Alsager
Sportspeople from Cheshire
English footballers
Association football forwards
Crewe Alexandra F.C. players
Witton Albion F.C. players
Sheffield United F.C. players
Shrewsbury Town F.C. players
Coventry City F.C. players
Crawley Town F.C. players
York City F.C. players
Morecambe F.C. players
Carlisle United F.C. players
Bolton Wanderers F.C. players
Nantwich Town F.C. players
Northern Premier League players
English Football League players